Butler Township is one of sixteen townships in Calhoun County, Iowa, United States.  As of the 2000 census, its population was 950.

History
Butler Township was created in 1871.

Geography
According to the USGS, it contains three cemeteries: Crown Hill, Saint Marys and Union.

References

External links
 City-Data.com

Townships in Calhoun County, Iowa
Townships in Iowa